"'In Times Like These" is a song written by Kye Fleming and Dennis Morgan, and recorded by American country music artist Barbara Mandrell.  It was released in April 1983 as the lead single from the album Spun Gold.  It peaked at number 4 on the U.S. Billboard Hot Country Singles chart and number 6 on the Canadian RPM Country Tracks chart.

Charts

Weekly charts

Year-end charts

References

1983 singles
1983 songs
Barbara Mandrell songs
Songs written by Kye Fleming
Songs written by Dennis Morgan (songwriter)
Song recordings produced by Tom Collins (record producer)
MCA Records singles